The Koliyanur is a revenue block in the Viluppuram district of Tamil Nadu, India. It has a total of 48 panchayat villages. Koliyanur which is a suburb of Villupuram city locating 5 km distance. This suburb lies on 45A (Villupuram-Pondicherry), 45C (Villupuram–Thanjavur).

References 
 

Revenue blocks of Villupuram district